Alyscha Mottershead (born May 2, 1991) is a Canadian former football player.

Life and career
Mottershead was born in Orangeville, Ontario, but was raised in Brampton. She played for Syracuse University, recording 74 matches played with 10 goals scored. At the club level, Mottershead played for SC Sand at the German 2. Bundesliga. Internationally, she represented Canada U17s at the 2008 CONCACAF Women's U-17 Championship where her team finished third and qualified for the 2008 FIFA U-17 Women's World Cup which Mottershead also participated representing Canada. On November 22, 2011, she debuted for the Canadian Senior Team against Sweden. In 2012, Mottershead was part of the squad that represented Canada at the 2012 CONCACAF Women's Olympic Qualifying Tournament where the Canadians finished second (just behind the United States) and, therefore, qualified for the 2012 Summer Olympics. In 2013, she played for Ottawa Fury.

References

External links
 
 Mottershead Profile at the Syracuse University
 

1991 births
Living people
Canada women's international soccer players
Canadian women's soccer players
People from Orangeville, Ontario
SC Sand players
Soccer people from Ontario
Syracuse Orange women's soccer players
Syracuse University alumni
Women's association football midfielders
Expatriate women's footballers in Germany
Canadian expatriate sportspeople in Germany
Canadian expatriate women's soccer players
Canadian expatriate sportspeople in the United States
Expatriate women's soccer players in the United States
Syracuse Orange women's soccer coaches
Woodbridge Strikers (women) players
Toronto Lady Lynx players
Ottawa Fury (women) players
USL W-League (1995–2015) players